Earthsiege is a series of games, spun off from the Metaltech series, which led into the Starsiege and Tribes (series) afterward. It includes:
Metaltech: Earthsiege
Earthsiege 2
The CyberStorm series.
Starsiege